Eric Kloss (born April 3, 1949) is an American jazz saxophonist.

Music career
Kloss was born blind in Greenville, Pennsylvania, near Pittsburgh, and attended the Western Pennsylvania School for the Blind, which was run by his father. When he was 10, he began to play the saxophone, and two years later he was playing in night clubs with professional musicians such as Bobby Negri, Charles Bell, and Sonny Stitt. At 16, he recorded his debut album, Introducing Eric Kloss (Prestige, 1965) with Don Patterson and Pat Martino.

On his third album, Grits & Gravy (1966), he was recording with musicians over twice his age: Jaki Byard, Richard Davis, and Alan Dawson. He continued recording and performing while a student at Duquesne University. A fan of Elvis Presley and The Ventures, he was attracted to the growth of jazz fusion in the 1960s and '70s, and eventually worked in the fusion idiom with musicians Chick Corea, Dave Holland, and Jack DeJohnette. He also collaborated with Richie Cole and Gil Goldstein, and did sessions with Cedar Walton, Jimmy Owens, Kenny Barron, Jack DeJohnette, Booker Ervin, Chick Corea, Barry Miles, and Terry Silverlight.

In the 1980s, Kloss taught at Rutgers University, then Duquesne and Carnegie Mellon. He and his wife, a vocalist, collaborated in a group called Quiet Fire. He has performed and recorded rarely since the 1980s due to health problems.

Eric was a frequent guest on the television show Mister Rogers' Neighborhood, appearing eight times, first in 1971 and finally in 1996.

Discography

As leader/co-leader 
 Introducing Eric Kloss (Prestige, 1965)
 Love and All That Jazz (Prestige, 1966)
 First Class Kloss! (Prestige, 1967)
 Grits & Gravy (Prestige, 1967)
 Life Force (Prestige, 1968)
 We're Goin' Up (Prestige, 1968)
 To Hear Is to See! (Prestige, 1969)
 Sky Shadows (Prestige, 1969)
 In the Land of the Giants (Prestige, 1969)
 Consciousness! (Prestige, 1970)
 One, Two, Free (Muse, 1972)
 Doors (Cobblestone, 1972)
 Essence (Muse, 1974)
 Bodies' Warmth (Muse, 1975)
 Together with Barry Miles (Muse, 1976)
 Battle of the Saxes with Richie Cole (Muse, 1977)
 Now (Muse, 1978)
 Celebration (Muse, 1980)
 Sharing with Gil Goldstein (Omni Sound, 1982)
 Sweet Connections: Live at EJ's (1998)

As sideman 
With Barry Miles 

 Sky Train (RCA, 1977)

With Eddie Jefferson

 The Live-Liest  (Muse, 1979)

With Pat Martino

 Desperado (Prestige, 1970)

References

1949 births
Living people
American jazz saxophonists
American male saxophonists
Musicians from Pittsburgh
Blind musicians
Cobblestone Records artists
Prestige Records artists
Transatlantic Records artists
Muse Records artists
People from Greenville, Pennsylvania
21st-century American saxophonists
Jazz musicians from Pennsylvania
21st-century American male musicians
American male jazz musicians